MV Clyde Clipper is a cruise boat, a purpose built catamaran with a capacity of around 250 passengers and facilities for weddings, functions and corporate hospitality, including bar and catering facilities. She was built by Abels Shipbuilders of Bristol in 2009.

From 30 June 2011 it was leased by Argyll Ferries Ltd as an interim ferry on the Gourock-Dunoon service, covering the service along with the  until the 244 passenger ferry  was converted from the ten-year-old Banrion Chonamara of the Irish Aran Island Service.

References

2009 ships
Ferries of Scotland